Mga Ibong Mandaragit  or Mga Ibong Mandaragit: Nobelang Sosyo-Politikal (literally, Birds of Prey: A Socio-Political Novel) is a novel written by the Filipino writer and social activist, Amado V. Hernandez in 1969.  Mga Ibong Mandaragit, hailed as Hernandez's masterpiece, focuses on the neocolonial dependency and revolt in the Philippines.  The novel reflects Hernandez's experience as a guerrilla intelligence officer when the Philippines was under Japanese occupation from 1942 to 1945.

Description
The narrative, illustrates Hernandez's yearning for change and the elevation of the status of Philippine society and living conditions of Filipinos.  The setting is in the middle of 1944, when the armed forces of the Japanese Empire were losing.

The novel acts as a sequel to Jose Rizal's historic Noli Me Tangere and El filibusterismo.  The protagonist Mando Plaridel is tested by Tata Matyas, an old revolutionary, on his knowledge about Rizal and Rizal's novels. Similar to Rizal's novel, the main character examines the Philippines as an outsider while traveling in Europe.  Hernandez's novel also tackles the lead character's search for Simoun's treasure, acting as a continuation of Rizal's El Filibusterismo.  The novel portrays the conditions of the citizenry at the onset of industrialization brought forth by the Americans in the Philippines.  Mga Ibong Mandaragit had been translated into English and Russian.

References

External links
Hernandez, Amado V.  Mga Ibong Mandaragit: Nobelang Sosyo-Politikal (1969),  PDF copy from AseanInfoNet.org, Tagalog language, National Library, Filipiniana section (call number FIL 899.2113 H43i 1982), and International Graphic Service, Quezon City, 416 pages (book)/216 pages (PDF file) – complete novel: PDF copy, retrieved on: March 5, 2008

Novels by Amado V. Hernandez
1969 novels
Political novels HAKAJSJUAUISA

Historical novels
Novels set in the Philippines
Novels set during World War II